This is a list of plants that have a culinary role as vegetables. "Vegetable" can be used in several senses, including culinary, botanical and legal. This list includes botanical fruits such as pumpkins, and does not include herbs, spices, cereals and most culinary fruits and culinary nuts. Edible fungi are not included in this list.

Legal vegetables are defined for regulatory, tax and other purposes. An example would include the tomato, which is botanically a berry (fruit), but culinarily a vegetable according to the United States.

Leafy and salad vegetables

Fruits

Chili peppers

Edible flowers

Podded vegetables

Bulb and stem vegetables

Root and tuberous vegetables

Sea vegetables

See also 

 Herbs
 Vegetable juice
 List of culinary fruits
 List of leaf vegetables
 List of vegetable dishes
 List of foods

References

External links 
 Lists of vegetables
 50 vegetables name in hindi and english

vegetables
vegetables
'